Dhermond is a village and union council also in the Talagang Tehsil, Talagang District, Punjab Province, Pakistan.  It is around 25 km from Tehsil Headquarters i.e. Talagang.  Its coordinates on the map are 32°56'41"N   72°10'11"E.

The population of Dhermond is around 25,000 and the majority of its people are serving in the Armed Forces of the country or associated with Govt. jobs.  The village has a High School for boys and another for girls.  The nearby villages are Darot, Dhoke Fateh Shah, Tamman, Budhial and Dhoke Mosahib.

The major crops of the area are wheat, Mongphali (Peanuts), Jawar, Bajra, Joa (Barley). 
The crops are dependent on rain but Tube wells are visible in many places.

The crime rate is almost nil. Awan, Rehan, Sabal, Jugial, Hafzal, Bhilwal, Sheral, Qutbal, Anwal and Syed are the major castes. Other castes include Malik, Daphral, Bhilwal and Arain.

Small streams of beautiful water flow These are called Ankar and Sir'ri on both sides of the village. Which makes the location of this village even more attractive

Topography
The terrain varies from fertile land to rocky places which are completely barren. The village is surrounded by two streams named Naala Sirri and Naala Ankar.

References

Official Facebook Page

Villages in Chakwal District